The Delaware Superior Court, previously known as the Superior Court and Orphans' Court, is the state trial court of general jurisdiction in the state of Delaware. It has original jurisdiction over most criminal and civil cases (except for suits at equity, which are handled by the Delaware Court of Chancery).  It also serves as an intermediate appellate court, hearing appeals on the record from the Court of Common Pleas, Family Court, and most state administrative agencies. It is headed by Judge Jan R. Jurden 

The Superior Court includes a Complex Commercial Litigation Division (CCLD), which has been operating as a Business Court since 2010. The CCLD focuses on commercial disputes for money damages between businesses, complementing the Court of Chancery which focuses on internal business disputes.

See also
Courts of Delaware

References

External links

Superior Court
Delaware
Courts and tribunals with year of establishment missing